A science ministry or department of science is a ministry or other government agency charged with science. The ministry is often headed by a minister for science.

List of ministries of science 
Many countries have a ministry of science or ministry of science and technology':
Ministry of Science, Technology and Productive Innovation (Argentina)
Ministry of Science and Technology (Bangladesh)
Ministry of Science and Technology (Brazil)
Innovation, Science and Economic Development Canada
Ministry of Science, Technology, Knowledge and Innovation (Chile)
Ministry of Science and Technology (China)
Ministry of Science, Technology and Environment (Cuba)
Ministry of Science, Technology and Innovation of Denmark
Ministry of Higher Education, Science and Culture (East Timor)
Federal Ministry of Education and Research (Germany)
Ministry of Education, Science and Culture (Iceland)
Ministry of Science and Technology (India)
Ministry of Research, Technology and Higher Education (Indonesia)
Ministry of Science, Research and Technology (Iran)
Department of Further and Higher Education, Research, Innovation and Science (Ireland)
Ministry of Education, Culture, Sports, Science and Technology (Japan)
Ministry of Education and Science (Lithuania)
Ministry of Education and Science (Macedonia) 
Ministry of Science and Technology (Malaysia)
Ministry of Education and Science (Mongolia)
Ministry of Science and Technology (Myanmar)
Ministry of Science and Technology (Pakistan)
Department of Science and Technology (Philippines)
Ministry of Science, Technology and Higher Education (Portugal)
Ministry of Science and Higher Education (Russia) 
Minister for Further Education, Higher Education and Science (Scotland)
Ministry of Education and Science (Somaliland)
Ministry of Science and ICT (South Korea)
Ministry of Science, Innovation and Universities (Spain)
Ministry of Science and Technology (Sri Lanka)
Ministry of Science and Technology (Taiwan)
Ministry of Science and Technology (Thailand)
Ministry of Industry and Technology (Turkey)
Ministry of Education and Science of Ukraine
Ministry of Science and Technology (Vietnam)

 Ministers of Science 
This is a list of Ministers who have a policy responsibility over Science.

: Minister of Science, Technology and Innovation: Marcos César Pontes
: Minister of Innovation, Science and Industry: Navdeep Bains
: Minister of Energy, Science and Technology (No longer used)''
: Minister for Further and Higher Education, Research, Innovation and Science: Simon Harris
: Minister of Education, Culture, Sports, Science and Technology: Kōichi Hagiuda
: Secretary of Science and Technology: Fortunato dela Peña
: Parliamentary Under Secretary of State for Science, Research and Innovation: Amanda Solloway
: Minister for Further Education, Higher Education and Science: Richard Lochhead

 
Science
Science-related lists